Statistics of Austrian first league in the 1934–35 season.

Overview
It was contested by 12 teams, and SK Rapid Wien won the championship.

League standings

Results

References
Austria - List of final tables (RSSSF)

Austrian Football Bundesliga seasons
Austria
1934–35 in Austrian football